
The Council of London in 1075 was a council of the Catholic Church in England held by the new Norman archbishop of Canterbury Lanfranc five years after his installation.  Other attendees included Gisa, Bishop of Wells and William the Norman (Bishop of London). The Council of London produced several decrees, these were known as the "Canons of the Council of London  AD 1075".

A number of copies of the acts of the council survive, which derive from two earlier copies, one from Canterbury and one from Worcester.

The following "Canons of the Council of London AD 1075", translated from the original Latin, are taken from the old register of the church at Worcester, the original document has a short historical preface followed by the nine canons and then a section with signatures of the two archbishops, twelve bishops, and twenty-one abbots, these were preceded by the Archdeacon of Canterbury.

Canons of the Council of London AD 1075
The original text was in Latin. The following is an English translation:

[There followed a list of the signatories, these were two archbishops, twelve bishops, and twenty-one abbots. The last abbots signature was preceded by that of the archdeacon of Canterbury]

Notes

Citations

References
 
 
 

London, 1075
Norman conquest of England
London, 1075
1075 in England
11th century in London